Sarah Rose (born 18 February 1986) is a Paralympic swimming competitor from Australia. She was born in Sydney with dwarfism. At the 2004 Athens Games, she competed in four events and won a bronze medal in the Women's 50 m Butterfly S6 event. At the 2008 Beijing Games she competed in four events.

At the 2006 IPC Swimming World Championships, she won a silver medal in the Women's 50m Butterfly S6.

In 2012, she made a comeback after a serious back injury and achieved her aim of selection for the Australian team to represent at the 2012 London Games.

She was an Australian Institute of Sport paralympic swimming scholarship holder from 2004 to 2009. She works as an administrative assistant for The House with No Steps, an organisation set up to help the disabled.

In 2016, she was awarded Speedo Services to the Australian Swim Team at the Swimming Australia Awards.

References

Female Paralympic swimmers of Australia
Swimmers at the 2004 Summer Paralympics
Swimmers at the 2008 Summer Paralympics
Paralympic bronze medalists for Australia
1986 births
Living people
Australian Institute of Sport Paralympic swimmers
Swimmers at the 2012 Summer Paralympics
Medalists at the 2004 Summer Paralympics
S8-classified Paralympic swimmers
Swimmers with dwarfism
Medalists at the World Para Swimming Championships
Paralympic medalists in swimming
Australian female freestyle swimmers
Australian female butterfly swimmers
20th-century Australian women
21st-century Australian women